Alexander Mikhaylovich Butlerov (Алекса́ндр Миха́йлович Бу́тлеров; 15 September 1828 – 17 August 1886) was a Russian chemist, one of the principal creators of the theory of chemical structure (1857–1861), the first to incorporate double bonds into structural formulas, the discoverer of hexamine (1859), the discoverer of formaldehyde (1859) and the discoverer of the formose reaction (1861). He first proposed the idea of possible tetrahedral arrangement of valence bonds in carbon compounds in 1862.

The crater Butlerov on the Moon is named after him.

Alexander Butlerov was born in Chistopol into a landowning family.

References

1828 births
1886 deaths
People from Chistopol
Chemists from the Russian Empire
Inventors from the Russian Empire
Academic staff of Saint Petersburg State University
Full members of the Saint Petersburg Academy of Sciences